Bisland may refer to:

People with the surname
Elizabeth Bisland (1861-1929), American journalist.
Rebecca Bisland (born 1982), English football player.
Rivington Bisland, American baseball player.

Other
Battle of Fort Bisland, battle during the American Civil War.